This is a list of notable AMP (Apache, MySQL/MariaDB, Perl/PHP/Python) software stacks for all computer platforms; these software bundles are used to run dynamic Web sites or servers. There are LAMPs  (for Linux);  WAMPs (for Windows); MAMPs (for macOS) and  DAMPs (for  Darwin); SAMPs  (for Solaris);  and FAMPs  (for FreeBSD).

See also
Composer (software)

References 

Lists of software
Web development software